Walking the Wire may refer to:
Walking the Wire (album), a 1992 album by Dan Seals
"Walking the Wire" (song), a 2017 song by Imagine Dragons

See also
Tightrope walking